Bruno Coutinho may refer to:
 Bruno Coutinho (footballer, born 1969), Indian footballer
 Bruno Coutinho (footballer, born 1986), Brazilian footballer